The Democratic Pact for Catalonia (PDC or PDpC) was a Catalan electoral alliance established in May 1977 ahead of the Spanish Congress of Deputies 15 June election. It ran on a political platform emphasizing the need of approving a statute of autonomy for Catalonia. The coalition comprised members from two separate, previously established alliances: Democratic Convergence of Catalonia (CDC) and Democratic Left of Catalonia (EDC) from the Democratic Front for Catalonia (FDC), and the Socialist Party of Catalonia–Regrouping (PSC–R) and the National Front of Catalonia (FNC) from the Left Front (FdE).

It obtained 514,647 votes (16.88% of the vote in Catalonia, 2.81% of the votes in Spain) and 11 deputies, of which 5 were for CDC, 4 for PSC–R and 2 for EDC. Its leader was Jordi Pujol. Shortly after the election, the coalition dissolved, as the PSC–R joined the Catalan Federation of the PSOE and the Socialist Party of Catalonia–Congress to form the Socialists' Party of Catalonia (PSC), while CDC (into which EDC was merged in 1978) joined with Democratic Union of Catalonia (UDC) to form Convergence and Union (CiU).

History
The alliance had its origins in an electoral platform formed in October 1976 by the Socialist Party of Catalonia–Regrouping (PSC–R), initially attracting the interest of Democratic Left of Catalonia (EDC) and Republican Left of Catalonia (ERC), to promote a "Left Front" ahead of the upcoming legislative election in Spain, inviting parties from the centre and centre-left, such as Democratic Convergence of Catalonia (CDC) or the Socialist Convergence of Catalonia (CSC)—the latter of which would merge with other parties and organizations into the Socialist Party of Catalonia–Congress (PSC–C) in November that year—to join it. EDC disengaged from the platform in December 1976 and reached an electoral alliance with Jordi Pujol's CDC instead, whereas the Left Front was joined by the National Front of Catalonia (FNC) and Catalan State (EC) and formally constituted as an electoral coalition on 11 March 1977. The PSC–C rejected joining the Front, on the grounds that their two political projects "absolutely diverged, in terms of motivations and goals", exploring instead an electoral alliance with the Catalan Federation of the PSOE for the Congress of Deputies, as well as the Agreement of the Catalans unitary coalition for the Senate.

Throughout the subsequent weeks, contacts would be maintained with other parties for a possible expansion of the Front to the entire Catalan democratic and socialist left—and into a "Socialist and Democratic Bloc of Catalonia"—but this came at the risk of compromising the Front's internal cohesion. Amid these expansion attempts, CDC's Jordi Pujol sought to incorporate the PSC–R, ERC and Democratic Union of Catalonia (UDC) into his "Democratic Front for Catalonia" alliance with EDC in order to establish a Catalanist bloc as broader as possible. While UDC was favourable to entering a coalition with CDC, it did not want to foregone its agreement with the Catalan Centre, the Union of the Centre and Christian Democracy of Catalonia (UCiDCC), and saw the proposal as absent of a larger degree of programatic concretion; EDC fully supported Pujol's proposal, whereas ERC and the PSC–R were initially only willing to consider alliances within the umbrella of their Left Front, as long as they respected their "Catalan Solidarity" proposal of post-election joint political action.

By late April, chances of UDC joining the CDC–EDC "Democratic Front" vanished after the former stuck to its UCiDCC alliance with the Catalan Centre, but negotiations continued between Pujol's alliance and the parties comprising the Left Front, resulting in the breakup of the latter and in the PSC–C and the FNC joining the CDC–EDC's coalition, rebranded as the "Democratic Pact for Catalonia", for the Congress of Deputies election. whereas ERC and EC were left out from the candidacy. A preliminary agreement had also been reached with the Social Democratic Party of Catalonia (PSDC), but it failed to materialize as the PSDC would attempt an alliance with the People's Party of Catalonia (PPC) and into the Union of the Democratic Centre in Catalonia (UCD).

Composition

Electoral performance

Congress of Deputies

Nationwide

Regional breakdown

See also
Democracy and Catalonia

References

1977 establishments in Spain
1978 disestablishments in Spain
Defunct political party alliances in Spain
Defunct political parties in Catalonia
Political parties established in 1977
Political parties disestablished in 1978